Cyclophora funginaria is a moth in the  family Geometridae. The type locality is unknown.

References

Moths described in 1858
Cyclophora (moth)